Soy Kim (born 김소연 in 1980) is a South Korean actress, singer-songwriter and model.

Career

Film
Soy started her acting career as Hye-young in the 2005 movie The Wig. After landing several lead roles in movies such as Drawing Paper, Ohayo Sapporo, she began working closely with Director Shin Yeon-shick in movies such as Rough Play, The Avian Kind, and most recently a lead role in his omnibus Like a French Film opposite Steven Yeun from The Walking Dead.

Interviewer
Due to her fluency in English, Korean & Chinese, Soy has had the opportunity to interview many Hollywood stars such as Ben Stiller, Liam Neeson, Mike Myers, Beyoncé. Most recently, Soy has interviewed Leonardo DiCaprio, Tom Hardy & Director Alejandro G. Iñárritu for the 2015 Academy Award-winning film The Revenant.

Music
Soy was included in the original lineup for S.E.S under SM Entertainment in 1997 but left the group prior to debut due to personal reasons.

Soy started her musical career as the leader of 5-member K-pop girl band T.T.MA in 1999. After releasing two albums, the group disbanded in 2002 and Soy now performs under the moniker, Raspberry Field.

Early life
Soy was born the youngest of 2 siblings in Hong Kong. She has an older sister named Hey (Real name: Kim Hye-won) who is married to Korean singer Cho Kyu-chan. Her parents were South Korean diplomats, allowing her to travel to many countries in her youth such as England, United States and Taiwan. Her cousin is singer Paul Kim.

Upon her return to South Korea, she enrolled in Korea University and graduated with a Bachelor's degree in Chinese Language & Literature. She is also an M.A. candidate in Media studies.

Soy is fluent in English, Korean & Chinese.

Filmography

Film

Television

Discography

As Raspberry Field

Studio albums
 Sweet & Bitter (2013)
 Dream, Cast (2015)

Singles
 Saturday Afternoon (2010)
 Have You Seen...? (2010)
 You Know, (2010)
 Can You (2012)
 What a Feeling (2013)
 Time Traveler (2013)

As T.T.MA

Studio albums
 In the Sea (1999)
 2nd Story I Wanna Be... (2000)

References

External links
 
 
 
 
 

Living people
1980 births
Hong Kong expatriates in South Korea
20th-century South Korean women singers
21st-century South Korean women singers
21st-century South Korean actresses
South Korean film actresses
South Korean television actresses
South Korean folk singers
K-pop singers
South Korean women pop singers
South Korean women singer-songwriters
South Korean guitarists
South Korean female idols
South Korean female models
Korea University alumni